Andrew Yuen Man-kit (born 28 January 1969) is a Hong Kong actor, model and presenter.

References

External links
Andrew Yuen Man-Kit at Asianuniverse
《最懂英超的游生》曼聯篇, Oriental Daily, 13 Aug 2017
「游生」彈起 狂吸金 袁文傑貼地過平民生活, Headline Daily, 29 July 2017
袁文杰经纪人-瀚星娱乐|瀚星广告|明星经纪公司

Hong Kong male actors
Hong Kong male models
Hong Kong television presenters
1969 births
Living people